Frans Hendrik van Eemeren (born 7 April 1946, Helmond) is a Dutch scholar, professor in the Department of Speech Communication, Argumentation Theory and Rhetoric at the University of Amsterdam. He is noted for his Pragma-dialectics theory, an argumentation theory which he developed with Rob Grootendorst from the early 1980s onwards. He has published numerous books and papers, including Strategic Maneuvering in Argumentative Discourse.

Selected works
Argumentation, Communication, and Fallacies: A Pragma-Dialectical Perspective (Hillsdale: Erlbaum, 1992), with Rob Grootendorst
Fundamentals of Argumentation Theory: A Handbook of Historical Backgrounds and Contemporary Developments (Mahwah: Erlbaum, 1996), with Rob Grootendorst

References

Prof. dr. F.H. van Eemeren at the University of Amsterdam Album Academicum website

1946 births
Living people
Dutch logicians
20th-century Dutch philosophers
Linguists from the Netherlands
Communication theorists
University of Amsterdam alumni
Academic staff of the University of Amsterdam
People from Helmond